Birds and People is a ten-year-long, groundbreaking collaboration between the publishers Random House and BirdLife International, to survey and document worldwide, the cultural significance of birds. The Birds and People project involves an open internet forum, for individuals worldwide to document their reflections, experiences and stories about birds. Established by the leading naturalist and author Mark Cocker in collaboration with the eminent wildlife photographer David Tipling and the Natural history specialist, Jonathan Elphick, the Birds and People project is a new experiment in natural history and cultural anthropology.

"The sense of freedom evoked by birds in flight has been a source of inspiration alike to tribal communities and the world’s major civilisations. Writers, poets, artists and composers have drawn on the qualities of birds for thousands of years. Today birds often play the role of ambassador in our entire relationship with nature. For environmentalists they are collectively the miner’s canary, their populations helping us to gauge the health of natural environments from the inner-city to the remote Arctic tundra. Yet our connections with birds far exceed any simple utilitarian value. Very often at a domestic level they are cherished for their own sake, as simple companions, as aesthetic adornments and as expression of some unspoken bond between ourselves and the rest of nature.

The resulting work is intended as a summary of the current state of birdlife worldwide. Cocker suggests that birds are the miner's canary for the natural world. However a further aim of the Birds and People project is to provide a panoramic survey of the multitudinous way in which birds enter and enrich human lives.

"The forum aims to bring together first-hand accounts from the staff and members of BirdLife Partners, and from the wider public.  The organisers hope that people from every country and territory involved in BirdLife will put forward the view of their respective nation or territory"  

Loss of biodiversity is invariably considered only in terms of its ecological and environmental consequences. Birds and People is intended to highlight how a decline in species inflicts parallel losses upon the very fabric of human cultures.

References

External links
 The Birds and People internet forum
 Birdlife International

Bird conservation
Birds in popular culture